Catania–Fontanarossa Airport , also known as Vincenzo Bellini Airport, is an international airport  southwest of Catania, the second largest city on the Italian island of Sicily. It is named after the opera composer Vincenzo Bellini, who was born in Catania.

According to Assaeroporti, it is the busiest airport in Sicily and the fourth busiest in Italy in 2020. Major airlines such as ITA Airways, Lufthansa and KLM offer services here and connect numerous European destinations such as Rome, Munich, Amsterdam and Berlin, while low-cost airlines such as easyJet and Ryanair offer flights to leisure destinations.

With nearly two million passengers carried in 2016, the Catania/Fontanarossa – Rome/Fiumicino route is Italy's busiest air route, and Europe's second busiest in 2021.

History

Early years
Catania Airport's history dates back to 1924, when it was the region's first airport. During World War II it was seized by the Allies during the Sicily Campaign and used by the United States Army Air Forces as a military airfield. Twelfth Air Force used the airport as a combat airfield, stationing the 340th Bombardment Group, which flew B-25 Mitchells from 27 August to 19 November 1943. In addition, the HQ, 51st Troop Carrier Wing used the airport from 29 September 1943 to 29 June 1944. Various transport units used the airport for the rest of the war. After the war, it was turned back over to civil authorities.

By the late 1940s, it was clear that the airport was fast running out of space and it was deemed necessary to relocate it. In 1950, the new bigger and improved Catania Airport opened for business.

After 20 years of unexpected growth and high passengers levels, in 1981 it was once again necessary to restructure the airport to cope with demand.

Development since the 2000s
In order to cope with the increasing passengers figures, a new terminal, equipped with 22 gates and six loading bridges, opened on 8 May 2007 replacing the old facilities.  The current "investment programme" has ensured that Catania Fontanarossa Airport continues to look forward and plan for growth over the next ten years, implementing a whole new infrastructure and making many additions, including a panoramic restaurant, a new airside runway and further office space.

Ryanair started flying to Catania in 2013, initially announcing only one route to Catania while also starting operations to Comiso Airport, a new airport which opened in 2013 and is located approximately 100 km from Catania, near the city of Ragusa.

To cope with the fast passenger growth, two additional terminals were opened in 2018 (Terminal B and C). Terminal C is used exclusively by easyJet.

Airlines and destinations
The following airlines operate regular scheduled and charter flights at Catania–Fontanarossa Airport:

Statistics

Ground transportation

Train
A new train station, Catania-Aeroporto Fontanarossa served by regional train lines such as the Messina-Syracuse railway, the Catania-Palermo railway, as well as the Catania-Caltagirone railway. 
Catania-Aeroporto Fontanarossa rail station is part of Catania's suburban railway line. The station is situated between Bicocca and Catania-Acquicella stations.
A typical journey to and from Catania Central Station will take less than 10 minutes, and approximately one hour to and from Syracuse or Taormina train stations.

Car
The airport is located close to the A19 motorway, which links Catania with Palermo and central Sicily, while the European route E45 runs to Syracuse in the south.

Bus
A shuttle bus service provides transport into Catania city centre and the Central Train Station, while scheduled bus services to other parts of the island are also available direct from the airport. The main bus station is opposite the railway station and 10 minutes walk from the city centre.

See also
Other airports in Sicily:
Palermo Airport Falcone e Borsellino – also known as Punta Raisi Airport
Trapani Birgi Airport Vincenzo Florio
Comiso Airport Vincenzo Magliocco

References

External links

 Official website
 
 

Airports in Sicily
Airport
Airport
Airfields of the United States Army Air Forces in Italy
Airports established in 1924
1924 establishments in Italy